What Good Is Grief to a God? is D.I.'s third full-length studio album, which was released in 1988.

Track listing
 "They Lie, You Die/Fatso Nero" (3:22)
 "Terrorist's Life" (3:19)
 "Sinning Artist Max" (2:47)
 "They Must Want to Die" (2:27)
 "Girl Scout Camp" (1:31)
 "No Mistakes" (3:23)
 "Shadow of a Fool" (3:52)
 "The Puppet" (2:39)
 "Don't Do It" (3:13)
 "Witch in the Canyon" (2:25)
 "Wanderings of a Giant" (4:04)
 "Johnny's Got a Problem" (2:10)
 "She's Obscene" (2:20)

Personnel
 Casey Royer - Lead Vocals
 John Calabro (John Bosco) - Guitars, Vocals
 Mark "The Kid" Cerneka - Guitars, Vocals
 Hedge - Bass
 Stevie DRT - Drums

References

1988 albums
D.I. (band) albums
Triple X Records albums